The 2013–14 Boston College Eagles men's ice hockey team represents Boston College in the 2013–14 NCAA Division I men's ice hockey season. The team is coached by Jerry York, '67, his twentieth season behind the bench at Boston College. The Eagles play their home games at Kelley Rink on the campus of Boston College, competing in Hockey East.

With the addition of the Notre Dame Fighting Irish to Hockey East, the Holy War rivalry extended to conference play between the Eagles and the Irish. The two teams played each other at Fenway Park on January 4 during the league's Frozen Fenway exhibit, where the Eagles topped the Irish in a 4–3 contest, and both teams played their final game of the season against each other at Kelley Rink on February 28, with the Irish winning 2–1 in overtime.

The Eagles competed in two tournaments during the 2013–14 season. The first tournament, on December 27–28, the Eagles played in the 2nd Annual Three Rivers Classic, played at the Consol Energy Center in Pittsburgh, where they defeated Bowling Green 5–0 in the first round and then won the championship by beating Penn State 8–2 in the second round. On February 3 and 10, the Eagles won their 5th straight championship in the 62nd Annual Beanpot Tournament, played at the TD Garden in Boston, Massachusetts, defeating Boston University 3–1 in the first round and Northeastern in the championship round by a score of 4–1.

The Eagles finished the season 28–8–4, 16–2–2 in conference play, capturing the Hockey East regular season title. However, they did not advance far into the Hockey East tournament, losing the best-of-three quarterfinals to rival Notre Dame in three games, at home. They would, however, succeed in the NCAA tournament, where they would win the Northeast Regional, played at the DCU Center in Worcester. A victory over Hockey East foe UMass Lowell advanced the Eagles to the program's 24th Frozen Four (tying Michigan for most appearances), but would lose to the eventual champions, the Union Dutchmen in the semi-final.

Previous season recap

The Eagles entered the 2013–14 season following a first round loss to Union College in the NCAA tournament, and a semifinals loss to Boston University in the Hockey East Tournament. Their postseason woes do not accurately reflect the success of the season, as the Eagles finished with a strong 22–12–4 record and 15–9–3 in conference play, one point short of the regular season title, as well as their fourth consecutive Beanpot championship in a 6–3 win over Northeastern. Sophomore Johnny Gaudreau was a Hobey Baker award finalist after helping the US National Junior team to win a gold medal at the 2013 World Junior championship in Ufa, Russia. Head Coach Jerry York became the winningest head coach in NCAA Hockey history, passing Ron Mason, with his 925th win over Alabama-Huntsville in the 2012 Mariucci Classic.

Offseason

Six Senior Eagles graduated in May: Captain Pat Mullane – F, Assistant Captain Steven Whitney – F, Brooks Dyroff – F, Assistant Captain Patrick Wey – D, Patch Alber – F, and Parker Milner – G.

Sophomore forward Johnny Gaudreau decided to remain at school for another season, to play with his younger brother Matt Gaudreau, who enrolled as a freshman this year.

Junior forward Patrick Brown was named Captain, with fellow juniors Bill Arnold and Isaac MacLeod named Assistant Captains for the 2013–14 season.

Long-time assistant coach Mike Cavanaugh left the team to become the head coach of the UConn Huskies hockey program.

Associate Head Coach Greg Brown was named an Assistant Head Coach for the 2014 US World Junior team that competed in Malmö, Sweden.

Long-time assistant coach and goaltending coach Jim Logue announced his retirement after twenty years of coaching.

Boston College hired Mike Ayers as an assistant coach and goaltending coach to replace Cavanaugh. Ayers spent his previous seasons coaching goalies on the US National Development Team

Former NHL player and Boston College alum Marty McInnis was hired on Sep. 12 as an assistant coach to fill the vacancy left by Jim Logue. McInnis played nearly 800 career games in the NHL and was inducted into the Boston College Varsity Club Athletic Hall of Fame in 2012.

In July, Connor McGlynn, who previously committed to joining Boston College in the fall of the 2013–14 season, signed with the Kingston Frontenacs of the OHL.

Recruiting
Boston College added ten freshmen for the 2013–14 season: six forwards, three defensemen, and a goaltender. A total of five of the ten incoming freshmen have been drafted in either the 2012 or the 2013 NHL Drafts.
 Ian McCoshen, D – Drafted with the first pick of the second round (31st Overall) in the 2013 Draft, by the Florida Panthers. He joins Mike Matheson as two of Florida's top defensive prospects, and potentially could be paired together in the NHL. McCoshen played for the Waterloo Blackhawks of the USHL.
 Scott Savage, D – Played on the USNTDP U-18 team with fellow Eagle recruit Steven Santini. Was originally expected to be drafted in 2013 but was passed over.
 Steven Santini, D – Drafted with the twelfth pick in the second round (42nd overall) in the 2013 Draft by the New Jersey Devils. Played with fellow recruit Scott Savage on the USNTDP U-18 team.
 Adam Gilmour, F – Drafted 98th Overall in the fourth round of the 2012 Draft by the Minnesota Wild. He played for the Muskegon Lumberjacks of the USHL. He also played with fellow Eagle recruit Chris Calnan on the Nobles in the Mass. prep league before joining the USHL.
 Evan Richardson, F – Played for the Powell River Kings of the BCHL. Was a leading scorer on the Kings with a near point/game average.
 Chris Calnan, F – Drafted 79th Overall in the third round of the 2012 Draft by the Chicago Blackhawks. Played on the South Shore Kings of the EJHL, and previously played with fellow recruit Adam Gilmour on the Nobles of the Mass. prep league.
 Austin Cangelosi, F – An electric playmaker who played for the Youngstown Phantoms of the USHL.
 Ryan Fitzgerald, F – Drafted 120th overall with the last pick in the 4th round of the 2013 Draft by the Boston Bruins, Ryan is a North Reading, MA native. He is a promising prospect, having been playing for the Valley Jr. Warriors of the EJHL. He also made a name for himself at the World U-17 Hockey Challenge by scoring 4 goals for the US and was also named MVP at the 2012 All-American Prospects Game.
 Matt Gaudreau, F – Younger brother of the star of the Eagles, Johnny Gaudreau, Matt played on the Omaha Lancers of the USHL, although he does not share the electric style of play his brother exhibits.
 Thatcher Demko, G – Demko is a highly touted goaltender who took over for Parker Milner. Demko isn't eligible for the draft until 2014 but is expected to be a first round pick. He was one of the top North American goalie prospects, posting a 31–9–3 record, a 2.06 GAA and a .912% save percentage playing for the U-18 USNTDP team. He also backstopped the US U-18 team to a silver medal at the 2013 IIHF World U18 Championships in Sochi, Russia. He was the goaltending leader at the 2012 World U-17 Hockey Challenge and also posted a period-and-a-half shutout at the 2013 All-American Prospects Game on September 26.

2013–2014 Roster

Departures from 2012–2013 Team
Steven Whitney, F – Graduation – Signed a try-out contract with the Anaheim Ducks AHL affiliate, the Norfolk Admirals.
Brooks Dyroff, F – Graduation
Pat Mullane, F – Graduation
Patrick Wey, D – Graduation – Signed a two year, entry level contract with his drafted team, the Washington Capitals.
Patch Alber, D – Graduation
Parker Milner, G – Graduation – Signed by the New York Islanders, likely to be assigned to their AHL affiliate, the Bridgeport Sound Tigers.
Mike Cavanaugh, Associate Head Coach – Job Change – Left to become the head coach of the UConn Huskies ice hockey team.
Jim Logue, Assistant Coach – Retirement
Colin Sullivan – Team Withdrawal – After playing in the exhibition game against St. Francis Xavier, Sullivan withdrew from the team due to the likelihood of receiving little to no playing time (due to the more skilled incoming freshman class). As a 7th round draft pick of the Montreal Canadiens, Sullivan chose to explore other options rather than stay with the team. He later signed with the Green Bay Gamblers of the USHL.

2013–14 Eagles

As of October 3, 2013.

Coaching staff

Standings

Schedule

Regular season

|-
!colspan=12 style=""| Exhibition

|-
!colspan=12 style=""| Regular season

|-
!colspan=12 style=""| Hockey East Tournament

|-
!colspan=12 style=""| NCAA Tournament

On October 18, Boston College hosted Jerry York Night, an evening which commemorated the head coach's recent accomplishment of becoming the winningest head coach in NCAA Hockey history. The event was supposed to have been held during the 2012–13 season but was postponed twice, once due to blizzard, and a second time due to York's absence as a result of a detached retina. The evening consisted of a speech by athletic director Brad Bates congratulating York on his accomplishment, a short video of York's life and road to win #925, and a new banner was unveiled in the rafters which reads "Jerry York '67: NCAA Record Wins 1972–present". York then made a short speech giving thanks to the school, fans, etc. The #7 Eagles defeated the #2 Badgers in a 9–2 rout, their first matchup since meeting in the 2010 NCAA national championship game, in which the Eagles won in a 5–0 shutout to secure their fourth national championship and third under York.
On November 8, BC and BU played their first matchup that did not include former Terrier head coach Jack Parker since 1974. Parker retired at the end of the previous season after 40 years of coaching at BU. It was the first non York-Parker matchup since 1994, when York first became the head coach at BC. The Eagles won 5–1. The previous day, November 7, York signed a contract extension to stay as the head coach of the Eagles through 2020, another six seasons of coaching. The game also ended an 8–game streak of the Eagles playing against ranked opponents.
On November 10, the day before Veterans Day, BC and Army played their first meeting since October 22, 1994, which happened to be Jerry York's first game coaching at Boston College. BC won 11–0 and continued its 25-game winning streak against Army, leading the all-time series 36–3–1. It was also Army's first time visiting Conte Forum.
 On December 6, the last home game before the holiday break, the team honored long-time assistant coach and former Eagles net-minder Jim Logue, who retired at the end of the previous season after 20 years of coaching at BC.
On December 27 and 28, the Eagles played in the 2nd Annual Three Rivers Classic played at the Consol Energy Center in Pittsburgh, defeating Bowling Green 5–0 in the first round and winning the championship with an 8–2 win over Penn State in the second round. Eagles freshman Ian McCoshen, Steven Santini and Thatcher Demko were not available for the tournament, as they were representing team USA in the 2014 World Juniors in Malmö, Sweden.
On January 4, the Eagles defeated rival Notre Dame 4–3 at Fenway Park during the league's third Frozen Fenway exhibit. The Eagles are now 2–1 playing at Fenway Park, having previously played at the home of the Boston Red Sox in 2010, a 3–2 loss to Boston University, and 2012, a 2–1 win over Northeastern.
On January 10, the Eagles downed #6 Providence in a 5–2 win in which senior Bill Arnold scored his 50th career goal and senior Kevin Hayes scored his 100th career point. Senior captain Patrick Brown scored the game winning power-play goal in his 100th career game.
On January 17, the Eagles defeated archrival Boston University 6–4 at home, earning coach Jerry York his milestone 950th career victory.
On February 3, Boston College beat rival Boston University 4–1 in the first round of the Beanpot tournament to advance to their fifth straight title game.
On February 10, Boston College defeated Northeastern 4–1 at the TD Garden to win their program-record fifth consecutive Beanpot championship and school's nineteenth title and eighth under coach York.
On February 15, Boston College defeated Vermont 5–3 to clinch the Hockey East Regular season trophy for best record in the conference.
On February 22, Boston College tied UMass Lowell 2–2 to end an 11–game winning streak but kept their 19–game unbeaten streak intact.
On March 1, the Eagles were defeated by rival Notre Dame 2–1 in overtime of the final regular season game to end their 19-game unbeaten streak.
On March 14–16, the Eagles were defeated by rival Notre Dame in the Hockey East Quarterfinals losing two games of the best of the three series by scores of 7–2 in Game 1 and 4–2 in Game 3. BC forced the decisive third game by winning Game 2 by a score of 4–2. This marks the first time since 2004 that BC has been defeated in the quarterfinals and also the first time since 2004 that BC has not swept the quarterfinals. That year, they lost to 8th seeded BU in three games. Also during the final game of the series, Johnny Gaudreau's point streak ended at 31 games, tying the Hockey East record for longest point streak set by Paul Kariya of the University of Maine in the 1992–93 season.
On March 19, the Hockey East conference announced the league's All-Rookie team, with freshman Thatcher Demko and Steven Santini getting honors, with Demko being a unanimous choice. The conference also awarded a number of league awards with BC players winning three of them. Those awards were: the 'Squad Locker' Scoring Champion to Johnny Gaudreau, who won the award for the second straight year with 36 points in 20 league games, the 'Gladiator' Best Defensive Forward title to Bill Arnold, who was a co-winner of the award, sharing it with Ross Mauermann of Providence, and lastly the 'Stop It' Goaltending Champion title to Thatcher Demko.
On March 20, BC forwards Johnny Gaudreau and Kevin Hayes were named top 10 finalists for the Hobey Baker award. They were the only finalists representing the Hockey East conference.
Also on March 20, the Hockey East conference announced the winners of the league's major awards, with junior forward Johnny Gaudreau repeating as Hockey Easy Player of the Year and coach Jerry York winning his third Coach of the Year award. The All-Star teams were also announced, with Gaudreau, Hayes and Matheson winning First-Team honors and Demko and Arnold earning Honorable Mentions.
On March 29 and 30, playing in the NCAA tournament Northeast Regional in Worcester, BC advanced to their 24th Frozen Four with victories over Denver (6–2) in the semifinal and UMass Lowell (4–3) in the final. The top line of Gaudreau-Arnold-Hayes scored eight goals in the two games, with Gaudreau recording his first career hat trick in the victory over Denver.
On April 2, Johnny Gaudreau was named a Hobey Hat Trick Finalist for the second straight year. The other finalists were Greg Carey of St. Lawrence University and Nic Dowd of St. Cloud State University.
On April 10, the Union Dutchmen defeated BC in the Frozen Four semifinal by a score of 5–4. This marks the first time since 2006 that BC did not win the national championship on an even-numbered year. It also was the final game as a college player for Eagles seniors Kevin Hayes, Bill Arnold, Patrick Brown, and Isaac McLeod.
On April 11, Johnny Gaudreau was announced as 2014's Hobey Baker Award winner, becoming the school's third recipient, joining David Emma (1991) and Mike Mottau (2000). Also announced were the ACHA Division I All American teams, with Gaudreau and Kevin Hayes earning First Team honors (Gaudreau's second year in a row), as well as Mike Matheson earning Second Team honors.
After the Hobey Baker Award ceremony, Gaudreau and Arnold signed entry level contracts with the Calgary Flames, with Arnold having graduated and Gaudreau choosing to forgo his senior year of NCAA eligibility. They both made their debut in the final game of the Flames' season on Sunday, April 12, against the Canucks in Vancouver. Gaudreau scored the only Flames goal in his first professional game.
On April 12, Patrick Brown, now an undrafted free agent, signed a try-out contract with the Carolina Hurricanes.
On May 8, Mike Matheson was named team captain for the 2014–15 season, with Quinn Smith and Michael Sit being named assistant captains.

Rankings

Statistics

Skaters

Goaltenders

Although BC's goaltenders have only recorded three shutouts, the team has four, due to a combined shutout in an 11–0 win over Army on November 10.

Awards and honors

Hobey Baker Award
Johnny Gaudreau, F – Winner
Kevin Hayes, F – Top 10 Finalist

ACHA Division I – All Americans
Johnny Gaudreau, F – First Team
Kevin Hayes, F – First Team
Michael Matheson, D – Second Team

Hockey East Player of the Year
Johnny Gaudreau, F – 2013–14

Hockey East All-Stars
Johnny Gaudreau. F – All-First Team
Kevin Hayes, F – All-First Team
Michael Matheson, D – All-First Team
Thatcher Demko, G – All-Rookie Team, Honorable Mention
Steven Santini, D – All-Rookie Team
Bill Arnold, F – Honorable Mention

Hockey East Awards
Johnny Gaudreau, F – 'Squad Locker' Scoring Champion, 36 Points
Thatcher Demko, G – 'Stop It' Goaltending Champion
Bill Arnold, F – 'Gladiator' Co-Best Defensive Forward

Hockey East Coach of the Year
Jerry York – 2013–14

National Player of the Month
Johnny Gaudreau, F – Month of January

National Rookie of the Month
Thatcher Demko, G – Month of January

Hockey East Player of the Month
Johnny Gaudreau, F – Month of November, Month of January, Month of February, Month of March

Hockey East Goaltender of the Month
Brian Billett, G – Month of December

Hockey East Rookie of the Month
Ryan Fitzgerald, F – Month of November
Thatcher Demko, G – Month of January

Hockey East Team of the Week
Week of January 27, 2014, Week of February 17, 2014, Week of March 31, 2014

Hockey East Player of the Week
Johnny Gaudreau, F – Week of November 11, 2013, Week of December 31, 2013, Week of March 31, 2014, Week of April 14, 2014 
Kevin Hayes, F – Week of January 20, 2014
Patrick Brown, F – Week of February 17, 2014

Hockey East Rookie of the Week
Ryan Fitzgerald, F – Week of November 4, 2013, Week of April 14, 2014 
Ian McCoshen, D – Week of March 31, 2014

Beanpot Most Valuable Player
Kevin Hayes, F

Beanpot Eberly Award
Thatcher Demko, G

62nd Walter Brown Award
Johnny Gaudreau

References

External links
BC Men's Hockey Home Page
BC Men's Hockey Page on USCHO

Boston College Eagles men's ice hockey seasons
Boston College Eagles
Boston College Eagles
Boston College
Boston College Eagles men's ice hockey season
Boston College Eagles men's ice hockey season
Boston College Eagles men's ice hockey season
Boston College Eagles men's ice hockey season